Tato is a given name and surname used independently in Romance languages and Georgian. A list of notable persons with the name:

Given name 
 Tato (died 510), king of the Lombards
 Tato Bores, stage name of Mauricio Borensztein (1927–1996), Argentinian film, theatre and television comedian
 Tato Laviera (1950–2013), Puerto Rican poet and activist 
 Tato Taborda (born 1960), Brazilian composer, pianist and teacher
 Jaume Morales Moltó, nicknamed Tato (born 1973), player of Valencian pilota
 Tato, character in the 1980s Spanish comics Chicha, Tato y Clodoveo
 Tato (Brazilian footballer) (born 1961), Brazilian footballer born Carlos Alberto Araújo Prestes
 Tato (Spanish footballer) (born 1992), Spanish footballer born Luis Alberto Díez Ocerín
 Tato Grigalashvili (born 1999), Georgian judoka

Surname 
 Anna Maria Tatò (born 1940), Italian film director
 Eloy Tato Losada (born 1923), Spanish born prelate of the Roman Catholic Church
 Franco Tatò (born 1932), Italian businessman
 Jesús Tato (born 1983), Spanish professional footballer
Manuel Tato (1907–1980), prelate of the Roman Catholic Church
Andreas Tatos Greek footballer

Spanish masculine given names
Georgian masculine given names
Italian-language surnames
Spanish-language surnames